Gluvo-nemo (Глуво-немо) or Deaf-mute dance in English is a Macedonian oro from the region of Mala Reka and Galičnik, region along the river of Radika.

It is a woman dance that is danced without music, only by the rhythm of the coins on the chests on the woman costumes. The dancers are holding belts with the left over the right arm and begin their dance in a position of a half circle.

See also
Music of North Macedonia

Further reading
Dimovski, Mihailo. (1977:52-3). Macedonian folk dances (Original in Macedonian: Македонски народни ора). Skopje: Naša kniga & Institut za folklor

Macedonian dances